Thomas Richter (born 1 November 1970) is a German former professional footballer who played as a defender.

References

1970 births
Living people
German footballers
Association football defenders
Stuttgarter Kickers players
SpVgg Greuther Fürth players
1. FC Nürnberg players
TSV 1860 Munich players
1. FC Magdeburg players
FC Augsburg players
Bonner SC players
FC Ingolstadt 04 II players
Bundesliga players
2. Bundesliga players
People from Waiblingen
Sportspeople from Stuttgart (region)
Footballers from Baden-Württemberg